Tauherenikau Racecourse is a racecourse near, Featherston. It is owned by The Wairarapa Racing Club

It is set in 110 acres of native trees.

Wairarapa Racing Club

The Wairarapa Racing Club was formed on 21 April 1864 and held meetings elsewhere in the province. Work began on the Tauherenikau Racecourse in 1866 and was completed in 1874. Its first meeting at Tauherenikau was on January 26/27, 1874.

In 2023 the Club has three galloping meetings, the New Year meeting on 2 January, a Waitangi Day meeting (6 February) and Sunday 6 November.

Masterton Jockey Club

The Masterton Opaki Jockey Club was formed in 1872. Racing began on the Opaki Race Course on Boxing Day in 1885 with trains traveling from Wellington for the occasion.

On 12 August 1896 the name was changed to the Masterton Racing Club and on 23 October 1987 the last meeting was held on the Opaki Course which then became a training centre. The Masterton Racing Club now race at Tauherenikau.

In 2023 the Masterton club has one race-day on 26 March.

See also
 Thoroughbred racing in New Zealand
 Trentham Racecourse

References

Sports venues in the Wellington Region
Horse racing venues in New Zealand
Featherston, New Zealand